The Czech Republic participated in the Eurovision Song Contest 2019 with the song "Friend of a Friend" written by Jan Steinsdoerfer, Maciej Mikolaj Trybulec and Albert Černý. The song was performed by the band Lake Malawi. The Czech broadcaster Česká televize (ČT) organised the national final Eurovision Song CZ 2019 in order to select the Czech entry for the 2019 contest in Tel Aviv, Israel. Eight entries competed in the national final and "Friend of a Friend" performed by Lake Malawi was announced as the winner on 28 January 2019 following the combination of votes from an eleven-member international jury panel and a public vote.

Czech Republic was drawn to compete in the first semi-final of the Eurovision Song Contest which took place on 14 May 2019. Performing during the show in position 6, "Friend of a Friend" was announced among the top 10 entries of the first semi-final and therefore qualified to compete in the final on 16 May. It was later revealed that Czech Republic placed second out of the 17 participating countries in the semi-final with 242 points. In the final, Czech Republic performed in position 3 and placed eleventh out of the 26 participating countries, scoring 157 points.

Background 

The nation competed in the contest on three consecutive occasions between 2007 and 2009 without qualifying to the final: in 2007 Kabát performing "Malá dáma" placed 28th (last) in the semi-final achieving only one point, in 2008 Tereza Kerndlová performing "Have Some Fun" placed 18th (second to last) in her semi-final scoring nine points and in 2009 Gipsy.cz performing the song "Aven Romale" placed 18th (last) in their semi-final failing to score any points. The Czech broadcaster withdrew from the contest between 2010 and 2014 citing reasons such as low viewing figures and poor results for their absence. Since returning to the contest in 2015 and qualifying to the final for the first time in 2016, Czech Republic has featured in two finals. In 2018, the country qualified to the final placing 6th with Mikolas Josef and the song "Lie to Me".

The Czech national broadcaster, Česká televize (ČT), broadcasts the event within Czech Republic and organises the selection process for the nation's entry. The broadcaster has used both national finals and internal selections to select the Czech Eurovision entry in the past. ČT confirmed their intentions to participate at the 2019 Eurovision Song Contest in August 2018, while also confirming that the Czech entry for the 2019 contest would be selected through a national final.

Before Eurovision

Eurovision Song CZ 2019
Eurovision Song CZ 2019 was the national final organised by ČT in order to select the Czech entry for the Eurovision Song Contest 2019. Eight entries participated in the competition which took place online between 7 and 21 January 2019, with the winner being selected via a jury and public vote and announced on 28 January 2019.

Competing entries 
Artists and composers were able to submit their proposals to the broadcaster between 31 August 2018 and 31 October 2018. Artists were required to have Czech citizenship and for groups of a maximum of six members, at least one of the lead vocalists were required to have Czech citizenship. Songwriters of any nationality were able to submit songs. The broadcaster received 300 submissions at the closing of the deadline, of which over 60 were written by Czech songwriters. ČT selected eight entries for the national final from the submissions received, which were presented to the public during a press conference on 7 January 2019.

Final 
Eight entries competed in the national final and the winner was determined by the combination of votes from an eleven-member international jury panel and a public vote held via the official Eurovision Song Contest application between 7 and 21 January 2019. The international jury consisted of ten former Eurovision entrants, while both international and Czech users were able to vote via the app. Votes from users in the Czech Republic were counted towards the public vote, while votes from international users were counted towards the jury vote and had a weighting equal to the votes of a single jury member. The winner, "Friend of a Friend" performed by Lake Malawi, was announced on 28 January 2019.

The international jury panel consisted of:

 Cesár Sampson – represented 
 Rasmussen – represented 
 Zibbz – represented 
 Ira Losco – represented  and 
 Elina Nechayeva – represented 
 AWS – represented 
 Alma – represented 
 Ari Ólafsson – represented 
 Jowst – represented 
 Ryan O'Shaughnessy – represented

Promotion
Lake Malawi made several appearances across Europe to specifically promote "Friend of a Friend" as the Czech Eurovision entry. On 16 February, Lake Malawi performed "Friend of a Friend" during the second semi-final of the Ukrainian Eurovision national final. The band performed during the Eurovision in Concert event which was held on 6 April at the AFAS Live venue in Amsterdam, Netherlands and hosted by Edsilia Rombley and Marlayne, the London Eurovision Party on 14 April at the Café de Paris venue in London, hosted by Nicki French and Paddy O'Connell, and the Eurovision Pre-Party Madrid event, which was held on 21 April at the Sala La Riviera venue in Madrid, Spain and hosted by Tony Aguilar and Julia Varela. On 24 April, Lake Malawi performed during the Eurovision Pre-Party, which was held at the Vegas City Hall in Moscow, Russia and hosted by Alexey Lebedev and Andres Safari.

At Eurovision 
According to Eurovision rules, all nations with the exceptions of the host country and the "Big Five" (France, Germany, Italy, Spain and the United Kingdom) are required to qualify from one of two semi-finals in order to compete for the final; the top ten countries from each semi-final progress to the final. The European Broadcasting Union (EBU) split up the competing countries into six different pots based on voting patterns from previous contests, with countries with favourable voting histories put into the same pot. On 28 January 2019, a special allocation draw was held which placed each country into one of the two semi-finals, as well as which half of the show they would perform in. The Czech Republic was placed into the first semi-final, to be held on 14 May 2019, and was scheduled to perform in the first half of the show.

Once all the competing songs for the 2019 contest had been released, the running order for the semi-finals was decided by the shows' producers rather than through another draw, so that similar songs were not placed next to each other. The Czech Republic was set to perform in position 6, following the entry from Slovenia and before the entry from Hungary.

In the Czech Republic, the semi-finals were broadcast on ČT2 and the final was broadcast on ČT1. All three shows featured commentary by Libor Bouček. The Czech spokesperson, who will announce the top 12-point score awarded by the Czech jury during the final, was Radka Rosická.

Semi-final

Lake Malawi took part in technical rehearsals on 4 and 9 May, followed by dress rehearsals on 13 and 14 May. This included the jury show on 13 May where the professional juries of each country watched and voted on the competing entries.

The Czech performance featured the members of Lake Malawi appearing on stage wearing jumpers of different colours: Albert Černý in yellow, Antonín Hrabal in black and Jeroným Šubrt in red. Each member were in separate blue, yellow and pink frames with the LED screens displaying yellow, red and black colours as well as the logo of the band with the word "Friend" in different languages written in it. The performance also featured the use of augmented reality, where the frames were multiplied and moved over the screen. Three off-stage backing vocalists performed with Lake Malawi: Adina Vostry, Jakub Gabriel Anděl Rajnoch and Jakub Xavier Baro.

At the end of the show, Czech Republic was announced as having finished in the top 10 and subsequently qualifying for the grand final. It was later revealed that the Czech Republic placed second in the semi-final, receiving a total of 242 points: 86 points from the televoting and 157 points from the juries.

Final 
Shortly after the first semi-final, a winners' press conference was held for the ten qualifying countries. As part of this press conference, the qualifying artists took part in a draw to determine which half of the grand final they would subsequently participate in. This draw was done in the order the countries were announced during the semi-final. The Czech Republic was drawn to compete in the first half. Following this draw, the shows' producers decided upon the running order of the final, as they had done for the semi-finals. The Czech Republic was subsequently placed to perform in position 3, following the entry from Albania and before the entry from Germany.

Lake Malawi once again took part in dress rehearsals on 17 and 18 May before the final, including the jury final where the professional juries cast their final votes before the live show. The band performed a repeat of their semi-final performance during the final on 18 May. Czech Republic placed eleventh in the final, scoring 157 points: 7 points from the televoting and 150 points from the juries.

Voting
Voting during the three shows involved each country awarding two sets of points from 1-8, 10 and 12: one from their professional jury and the other from televoting. Each nation's jury consisted of five music industry professionals who are citizens of the country they represent, with their names published before the contest to ensure transparency. This jury judged each entry based on: vocal capacity; the stage performance; the song's composition and originality; and the overall impression by the act. In addition, no member of a national jury was permitted to be related in any way to any of the competing acts in such a way that they cannot vote impartially and independently. The individual rankings of each jury member as well as the nation's televoting results were released shortly after the grand final.

Below is a breakdown of points awarded to the Czech Republic and awarded by the Czech Republic in the first semi-final and grand final of the contest, and the breakdown of the jury voting and televoting conducted during the two shows:

Points awarded to the Czech Republic

Points awarded by the Czech Republic

Detailed voting results
The following members comprised the Czech jury:
  (jury chairperson)singer
 Iva Bokovájournalist, show host
 Šimon Holýfilm director, musician, show host
 radio show host, media consultant
 Aneta Kharitonova (Anett X)singer

References

2019
Countries in the Eurovision Song Contest 2019
Eurovision